Robert Glover (died 1555) was an English Protestant martyr who was burnt at Coventry in September 1555.

Glover was born at Mancetter, Warwickshire, and educated at Eton College and King's College, Cambridge. Under Henry VIII he became attracted to Protestant views. He gained in BA in 1538, MA in 1541, and was a fellow until 1543. He married a niece of Hugh Latimer.

He was burnt to death at Coventry for heresy on 20 September 1555.  He had been arrested earlier that year.

Glover is among twelve such martyrs from the reigns of Henry VIII and Mary I commemorated on a memorial in the city, who are known collectively as the Coventry Martyrs.

Notes

References
Creasy, E. S., Memoirs of Eminent Etonians: With Notices of the Early History of Eton College, R. Bentley, 1850.

1555 deaths
People educated at Eton College
Alumni of King's College, Cambridge
16th-century Protestant martyrs
Year of birth unknown
16th-century English people
People from Warwickshire
People executed by the Kingdom of England by burning
Executed British people
Protestant martyrs of England